Mark Tymchyshyn (born July 30, 1958) is an American actor perhaps best known for his role in George Lopez as Mel Powers, a factory owner. Tymchyshyn is a graduate of Wayne State University (MI).

Career
He directed A Lie of the Mind with playwright Sam Shepard.  He also has cameo roles in shows such as ER, Diagnosis Murder, Monk, Seinfeld, The Drew Carey Show, and Boston Legal.  From 1990 to 1992, he portrayed the character of Gavin Kruger in the daytime drama As the World Turns and also appeared in an episode of Malcolm in the Middle in 2000.  He originally intended to become a teacher, but is now both an actor and professor.

Filmography

References 

1957 births
Living people
American male film actors
American male television actors
American theatre directors